Estadi Baldi Aleu is a rugby union stadium in Sant Boi de Llobregat, Barcelona Province, Spain.  Its location lies between the Baldi Aleu and Cerdaña streets in Sant Boi de Llobregat. 
UE Santboiana plays there its home matches in División de Honor. The field is named after Baldiri Aleu Torres, UE Santboiana's first chairman, between 1921 and 1936
The field has capacity for 4000 spectators after its refurbishment in the 2000s.

References

External links
UE Santboiana official website

Rugby union stadiums in Spain
Sports venues in Catalonia
Sant Boi de Llobregat